Allison & Allison was the architectural firm of James Edward Allison (1870-1955) and his brother David Clark Allison (1881-1962).

Originally based in Pittsburgh, Pennsylvania, in 1910 the Allisons moved to Los Angeles in Southern California.  At first they specialized in public schools.

Projects
The notable projects by this firm include:

 Riverview United Presbyterian Church, Pittsburgh, (1907).
 J George Becht Hall, Clarion University, Clarion, PA (1907).
 Friday Morning Club Building, Downtown Los Angeles, (present day Variety Arts Center), Downtown Los Angeles (1923).
 Wilshire United Methodist Church, with Moorish Revival 'La Giralda Tower' (1924).
 First Baptist Church of Los Angeles, Westmoreland and 8th Street, Los Angeles (1925).
 Western Pacific Building, South Broadway, Downtown Los Angeles (1925).
 Thirteenth Church of Christ Scientist, (1926).
 First Unitarian Church of Los Angeles, MacArthur Park district, Los Angeles, 1927.
 The Janss Dome—Janss Investment Company Building, Westwood Village, (1929).
 Royce Hall and Kinsey Hall, two of the four original buildings on the campus of the University of California, Los Angeles, 1929 - 1932.
 Southern California Edison Building, Downtown Los Angeles, 1930, by staff designer Austin Whittlesey, with murals by Hugo Ballin and exterior bas-reliefs by Merrell Gage.
 First Congregational Church, Commonwealth and 6th Street, Los Angeles, (1932).
  Kerckhoff Hall, UCLA campus (1930).
 Beverly Hills Post Office, Beverly Hills, California, with Ralph Flewelling (1932-1933).
 Kaufman Hall, UCLA campus (1932).
Robinson's Department Store, Downtown Los Angeles flagship store, modernization of street facades with Edward Mayberry (1937).
 Hollywood Post Office (Hollywood Station) in Hollywood, with Claud Beelman & WPA artists (1937).

See also

References

External links

Defunct architecture firms based in California
 
Architects from Los Angeles
Architects from Pittsburgh
University of California, Los Angeles buildings and structures